is a game for Nintendo's Virtual Boy video game console. The game is a boxing simulator played in the first-person point of view.

Gameplay and premise

Teleroboxer takes place in the 22nd century, when a technology called "Telerobotics" is used, allowing people to control robots to do tasks not normally doable by humans. Teleroboxing was created by Dr. Edward Maki Jr., involving two robots boxing against each other.

Development
Teleroboxer was originally known as Teleroboxing, and was displayed at the 1994 Consumer Electronics Show. Like all other Virtual Boy games, Teleroboxer uses a red-and-black color scheme and uses parallax, an optical trick that is used to simulate a 3D effect.

Reception
Teleroboxer received mixed to positive reviews. On release, Famicom Tsūshin gave the game a score of 23 out of 40. Author Steve L. Kent noted that players of it at an early show were unimpressed with it. He added that these players also complained about headaches, though adding that it made the best use of the 3D capabilities of all the Virtual Boy games shown. It was featured on GamesRadar's list of the five best Virtual Boy games, noting that people were excited to play it when the platform launched.  Chicago Tribunes David Jones also compared it to the Punch-Out!! series, noting that it has an edge due to its fun and competitive atmosphere. ABC Good Game made a similar comparison, though noting that it was less fun. He cited its "stupid hard" difficulty, feeling that the fights were so in favor of the opponents that players "couldn’t help but shout obscenities at it". The Los Angeles Times Aaron Curtiss called it a traditional game, though they don't feel traditional on the Virtual Boy. Electronic Entertainments Steve Klett called its controls "kludged". They also gave good impressions of it before its release, calling it cool. Wired's Chris Kohler called it "too difficult for its own good." 1UP.com's Neal Ronaghan praised it for its graphics and its gameplay, which he calls intense, but criticized the controls as convoluted. WGRD 97.9 wrote that it was a game that people should "play before they die," noting that it's not the best game ever, but its use of the Virtual Boy's technology makes it interesting.

IGN AU's Patrick Kolan called it an evolution of Punch-Out!!, commenting that it felt like a spiritual successor to it as well. He called it a tough game, feeling that the only thing that made it playable was that players could save their progress. While he also found it to be rushed in some areas, he called it "fun and bitterly hard." He would also call it one of the few decent games on the platform and noted that the use of two d-pads gave it increased dimension in an interesting way. Allgame's Scott Alan Marriott called it a title with a lot of promise that ended up a disappointment. He criticized its controls in conjunction with the high speed of the computer-controlled enemies for making it far too difficult, while noting the sound and visuals as the high points of the game. Nintendo Life's Dave Frear also called it disappointing, though commenting that it gets very easy after players learn the game. Retro Gamer's Stuart Hunt praised its use of the two d-pads and the use of 3D.

GameFans two reviewers gave it above average reviews; the first said that he could live without it, stating that fans of the Punch-Out!! series might enjoy it, but the controls were too complicated and the pace too fast for him. The other reviewer called it the second worst launch game for the platform, echoing the first reviewer's complaints. She gave praise to its visuals, however. GamePros "Slo Mo" called the challenge "no-nonsense" and the fighters imaginative, while finding the visuals to be among the best on the system. Next Generation called it a "high-tech" remake of Punch-Out!! for the NES, commenting that its 3D effects were limited. However, they felt that the visual quality was very high compared to other titles on the platform. Nintendo Magazine felt that Teleroboxer before release was the weakest of the titles they saw. Tips & Tricks gave it a rarity rating of two out of 10. Official Nintendo Magazine noted it as the most common Virtual Boy game.

See also
List of Virtual Boy games
List of fighting games

Notes

References

External links
 Official Nintendo web page (Japanese) (Translated using Excite.Co.Jp)

Boxing video games
Nintendo games
Nintendo Integrated Research and Development games
Single-player video games
Virtual Boy games
1995 video games
Video games about robots
Video games developed in Japan
Video games set in the 22nd century